Wolferton is a village and former civil parish, now in the parish of Sandringham, in the King's Lynn and West Norfolk district, in the county of  Norfolk, England. It is 2 miles west of Sandringham, 7½ miles north of King's Lynn and 37¼ miles northwest of Norwich. In 1931 the parish had a population of 185. On 1 April 1935 the parish was abolished and merged with Sandringham.

Background

The village's name means 'Wulfhere's farm/settlement'.

Wolferton is best known as the location of Wolferton railway station. The station was opened in 1862 after Queen Victoria had purchased the site of Sandringham House as a Norfolk retreat. The station contained a set of elegant reception rooms, where the several generations of the royal family and their visitors would wait for transportation to Sandringham House. 
The 13th-century St Peter's Church was damaged by fire in the 15th century, and restored in the 19th century by Arthur Blomfield. It retains its medieval parclose screens.

In popular culture
The first episode of the Netflix series The Crown is called "Wolferton Splash" because part of it takes place on a marsh duck shooting expedition from Sandringham House on which King George VI (Elizabeth's father) invites newly married Prince Philip.

References

External links

 

Villages in Norfolk
Former civil parishes in Norfolk
Sandringham, Norfolk